is a Japanese actress and model, and formally trained in ballet. She made her acting debut in the movie Bounce Ko Gals (1997), for which she was given a Best New Talent award at the Yokohama Film Festival. She has since appeared in other feature films including I Love Peace (2003), Mimibukuro Ghost Stories (2004) and Welcome, Patient (2005). She has also made numerous stage performances, including Mirandolina (1998) and Wee Thomas (2003). in 2001, made a guest appearance in the movie Hyakujuu Sentai Gaoranger: Fire Mountain Roars. She played as Nagi Saijyo in Ultraman Nexus. Her most recent role was a guest appearance in GARO where she played as the Makai Priestess Jabi for 3 episodes. She returned to show in Garo Special: Byakuya no Maju. She is also a music artist under the Japan Sony label. She provided motion capture for the protagonist of Haunting Ground.  She worked under her stage name "さとう やすえ" (the same reading) from 2006 to 2012.

External links

 
 
 YS Jewel Brand
 佐藤康恵 オフィシャルブログ LINE BLOG（2017年1月12日 - ）
 Yasue Sato's music debut

References

1978 births
Japanese film actresses
21st-century Japanese women singers
21st-century Japanese singers
Japanese jewellery designers
Living people
People from Saitama Prefecture